Garfield Gets Real (also known as Garfield 3D in some regions) is a 2007 American direct-to-video computer-animated comedy film based on the comic strip Garfield. It was produced by Paws, Inc. in cooperation with Davis Entertainment, and The Animation Picture Company and distributed by 20th Century Fox Home Entertainment. It was written by Garfield's creator Jim Davis, who started working on the script in the autumn of 1996. This was the first fully animated Garfield production since the 1991 television special Garfield Gets a Life, and the season finale of Garfield and Friends. The DVD was shipped to stores on August 9, 2007.  Gregg Berger, an actor from the original series, reprises his role of Odie, but Garfield was voiced by veteran voice actor Frank Welker, since the original actor Lorenzo Music died six years earlier in 2001 and Jon is voiced by Wally Wingert, as Thom Huge retired that same year. The film received unfavorable reviews.

Plot
Garfield lives with canine Odie and owner Jon Arbuckle in a world inhabited by comic/cartoon characters. Garfield and the gang work at the Comic Studios with other comic strip characters, such as his girlfriend Arlene, frenemy Nermal, Billy Bear, Randy Rabbit, & inventor Wally Stegman & his wife, Bonita, where the comics are made in their world and sent to "The Real World" where it's made in books & newspapers. Garfield is tired of the old jokes his friends crack and is bored with life in Toon World and longs to go to The Real World. The Comic Strip requires a bone for Odie, but he does not want to give back the bone and looks for a place to hide it. But he accidentally makes the bone go through the screen in the studio and it is sucked into the Real World.

Eli, the head technician, explains to the toons that the screen separates Toon World and the Real World with no way back. Garfield sees his chance for a change in life and goes through the screen without anyone noticing. As soon as he enters the Real World, the toons discover this on their projector and Eli blocks the patch in the screen border by taping special tape on it, so no one can gain access to the real world. However, Odie jumps onto the screen trying to get his bone which is on the screen but actually is in the real world and gets sucked there as well before the patch is sealed, making Garfield and Odie permanently stuck in the Real World. Garfield tries to get Odie back to Toon World, but due to him not listening to Eli's warnings, fails to do so. Odie gets his bone back and he and Garfield go find some food. While trying to get used to their new surroundings, Garfield meets an alley cat named Shecky who yearns to be a star while Odie is chased by a gang of Chihuahuas who want his bone, but is saved by Garfield who grabs the bone and runs through a hole in a tree which is small for the Chihuahua's fat owner to get through.

The duo learns from Shecky that strays get food by annoying the people who live in a building and the people start throwing food at Shecky. After dinner, he brings the duo to their new home, an abandoned inn populated by colonies of stray pets called Hotel Muncie, where he invites them to join the family. The next day, the duo finds out that due to their absence, their comic is getting canceled. Garfield finds an article asking people to try out and replace him. The duo head for the place where they are doing try-outs and try to impress the judges, but fail due to the judges not realizing they're the real ones and they decide to hire Hale and Hardy, an equally muscular cat & dog, to replace them. However, after second thoughts, the judges come to their senses and give Garfield & Odie one more chance: if they do not make it back home in 24 hours, Hale and Hardy will replace them. Garfield gives Wally an idea of building a big tunnel that can go through the screen after remembering seeing one of Wally's latest inventions earlier and shares the idea with his friends back in Toon World.

Later that night, Hale and Hardy, who are determined to stop the duo, capture everyone in the inn and set the hotel on fire. Billy Bear, Wally and Jon go through the tunnel (which Wally dubs the Bonitinator due to the blade reminding him of his wife) to save the three friends, but all the exits are blocked. Luckily, Shecky finds a fire-proof trash cart and Jon, Wally, Odie, Garfield and Shecky are about to escape when Odie realizes his bone is missing and finds it lying on a chandelier & jumps onto it. Garfield grabs Odie's paw on the second floor and tries to pull him onto the cart, but Odie pulls Garfield onto the chandelier instead, which is about to collapse. Garfield grabs Jon's hand and the entire cart is flung into the air as the chandelier collapses, causing the cart to fall to the ground with the chandelier on it. The cart crashes out of the hotel and the group are flung into the big tunnel as it closes, disappears and transported back to Toon World. Following this, Shecky then decides to stay with the group. 

The next day, everyone from both worlds (except Hale & Hardy, who now live on the streets) celebrate Garfield & Odie's return and Shecky accomplishes his dream of making it to stardom. Later, the Chihuahuas who kept chasing Odie's bone in the Real World are shown to have secretly stowed away on the tunnel.

Cast

Cameos
Similar to Who Framed Roger Rabbit and Toy Story, Garfield Gets Real has a few cameo appearances by licensed comic strip characters:

 Dagwood Bumstead from Blondie
 Grimm from Mother Goose and Grimm
 Snoopy from Peanuts (mentioned)

Reception

Box office 
The film was only released theatrically in Turkey. The film started at second in its opening weekend, grossing $592,974 from 130 theaters, with an average of $4,561 per theater. The film stayed second the next weekend, falling 34.1% to $390,688, before dropping down to third in its third weekend, decreasing 30.9% to $269,798. The film fell down to fifth in its fourth weekend, decreasing 40.8% to $159,768.

Critical reception 
The film received negative reviews from critics. Brian Costello awarded the film 2 out of 5 stars, criticizing the juvenile humor, but writing, "this movie is best for younger children and fans of the Garfield comic strip".

Video game 
A video game based on the film, Garfield Gets Real, was released in the United States on July 21, 2009 and received negative reviews.

Sequels
Despite the negative reviews it spawned a franchise consisting of two sequels, Garfield's Fun Fest and Garfield's Pet Force.

References

External links

 
 

2007 films
2000s English-language films
20th Century Fox animated films
American computer-animated films
Davis Entertainment films
Direct-to-video animated films
Garfield films
Films with screenplays by Jim Davis (cartoonist)
20th Century Fox direct-to-video films
2000s American animated films
Animated films directed by Mark A.Z. Dippé
Animated films based on comics
American children's animated comedy films
American children's animated fantasy films
Animated films about cats